Banjar Margo is a district (kecamatan) located in the Tulang Bawang Regency of Lampung in Sumatra, Indonesia.

Border 
The border district of Banjar Margo as follows:

North is bordered by Mesuji Regency, South is bordered by Banjar Agung District, in the West it is bordered by West Tulang Bawang Regency and east is bordered by Gedung Aji District.

References

External links
  

Tulang Bawang Regency
Districts of Lampung